20Q is an American game show based on the online artificial intelligence and handheld computer game of the same name. Licensed to and produced by Endemol Shine North America, it premiered on June 13, 2009 during Big Saturday Night airing on GSN, and is hosted by Cat Deeley of So You Think You Can Dance with the voice of Mr. Q provided by Hal Sparks.

In Argentina, the name of the show is Flor de palabra; it is hosted by Florencia Pena and Richard Rubin of Beauty and the Geek.

Gameplay
The game is divided into four parts.

Preliminary game
The first part involves members of a randomly selected row of the studio audience. Mr. Q gives a category, and clues to the identity are revealed one at a time. The first contestant to come up with the correct answer qualifies to play the main game. Three qualifiers are determined in each preliminary round.

Main game
The three players then play the main game head-to-head. The computer gives a category, and then are given a choice of two questions. For example, if the category is Food and Drink, the questions would be "Is it caffeinated?" or "Is it served for breakfast?" A player in control asks either of the two questions, and if the answer is yes, that player retains control of the board; otherwise, s/he loses control. On each turn, after a question has been asked, the player can either choose a question that hasn't been played yet, or ask for a new pair of questions and ask one of those questions. If the player asks for 2 new questions she/he has to choose one of them. Or s/he can choose to attempt to come up with the correct answer. If correct, the player wins the game, $5,000, and a chance to play the semi final round against the winner of the second main game; a wrong answer loses control.

Semi-final
In the semi-final round, the players compete one at a time in the same category, with one player (via coin toss) on stage, and the other player offstage in a soundproof isolation booth. The first player is given a category, and then a series of clues. Every few seconds (signaled by two short low-pitched beeps), another clue appears on the screen. The player's objective is to guess the subject using as few clues as possible. The other player then plays the same category, and tries to come up with the answer in fewer clues. The player that can figure out the subject with fewer clues wins a prize and goes to the end game.

End game
In the end game, the player is given selection of two categories, and the computer must play the game as the contestant asks questions from a provided list of 20. While the computer can attempt to answer at any time, the contestant is only given one chance to guess the answer. At a critical point in the game, the computer goes into "sleep mode" and the host asks the contestant if s/he has any idea what the answer is, after which Mr. Q. awakens from his "nap." If the player buzzes in with the right answer before the computer does, s/he wins $20,000; if the computer is wrong, the human contestant gets one chance to win; should s/he be incorrect or the computer comes up with the right answer first, nothing additional is won.

Pilot
The pilot was taped on August 16, 2008 with Joey Lawrence of Blossom fame, but Deeley replaced Lawrence due to a conflict.

Ken Jennings was featured as the "residential expert", who picked out the categories. The front game was played the same, except losers earned $1,000 for making it on stage, and the winner of the round won $20,000.

In addition, each contestant has a computerized scribble pad that shows the audience the answers they think the person, place, or object could be. The contestants would then buzz-in with their final answer.

Only one game is played; that player went on to the endgame, which was played the same, but before the round the player selected one of 25 balls, each having a covering concealing a number that, should the contestant win the round, would multiply the $20,000 won earlier, up to $500,000.

Finally, the "computer" had a female voice, and was referred to as "Debra-Q".

References

External links
 20Q.net Inc. site

Game Show Network original programming
2000s American game shows
2009 American television series debuts
2009 American television series endings
English-language television shows
Television series based on Internet-based works